Stephen Wesley Nease (January 15, 1925 – April 6, 2006) was an educator and president of four different institutions of higher education. He was the father of two daughters, Linda Scott and Melissa Wallace; four sons, Floyd Nease (Representative to the Vermont State House and Majority Leader), Stephen Nease, Jr., David Hardy Nease (who died at the age of 9), and David Wayne Nease.

Early life and education
Stephen W. Nease was born January 15, 1925, in Quincy, Massachusetts, to Madeline Nostrand and Floyd W. Nease while his father was president of Eastern Nazarene College. He earned his AB from Brown University and his ThB from Eastern Nazarene College in 1951. He later completed graduate work at Harvard Divinity School, and ENC awarded him an honorary Doctor of Divinity in 1966.

Career
Stephen W. Nease served as dean of men at Eastern Nazarene College in 1950. He became the executive field secretary in 1952, and was director of development in 1958. He then served as the founding president of Mount Vernon Nazarene College from 1966 to 1972, when he became the president of Bethany Nazarene College. He left the presidency at Bethany to take on the presidency of Nazarene Theological Seminary in 1976. In 1981, he left to become the president of his alma mater, Eastern Nazarene College.

In 1989, Nease was elected by the Church of the Nazarene to serve as the first Commissioner of Education. He held this position until retirement in 1994. In retirement, he served in the development office at Mount Vernon Nazarene until 2000.

Notes and references

External links
Stephen Wesley Nease funeral sermon by Russell Metcalfe

1925 births
2006 deaths
Brown University alumni
Harvard Divinity School alumni
Presidents of Eastern Nazarene College
Eastern Nazarene College alumni
Seminary presidents
People from Quincy, Massachusetts
Presidents of Mount Vernon Nazarene University
Presidents of Southern Nazarene University
Presidents of Nazarene Theological Seminary
American members of the Church of the Nazarene
20th-century Methodists